A quinaria (plural: quinariae) is a Roman unit of area, roughly equal to  . Its primary use was to measure the cross-sectional area of pipes in Roman water distribution systems.

In Roman times, there was considerable ambiguity regarding the origin of the name, and the actual value of a quinaria.  According to Frontinus:

...Those who refer (the quinaria) to Vitruvius and the plumbers, declare that it was so named from the fact that a flat sheet of lead 5 digits wide, made up into a round pipe, forms this ajutage. But this is indefinite, because the plate, when made up into a round shape, will be extended on the exterior surface and contracted on the interior surface. The most probable explanation is that the quinaria received its name from having a diameter of 5/4 of a digit...

According to Frontinus, the name and value is derived from a pipe having a diameter of "5/4 of a digit".

The importance of this measure was that water taxes in ancient Rome were based on the size of the supply pipe.

See also
 Ancient Roman weights and measures
 Water theft#Roman period

Notes and references

External links
The Quinaria, part of the Encyclopædia Romana

Units of area
Human-based units of measurement
Ancient Roman units of measurement